Kourouba  is a village and rural commune in the Cercle of Kati in the Koulikoro Region of south-western Mali. The commune covers an area of 245 km2 and includes 5 villages. In the 2009 census the commune had a population of 8,248. The village of Kourouba is on the right bank of the Sankarani River just upstream of where it joins the Niger River.

References

External links
.

Communes of Koulikoro Region